Shimen District, also known as Sekimon, is a sparsely populated rural district in the northern part of New Taipei City in northern Taiwan. It is part of the North Coast and Guanyinshan National Scenic Area and includes Taiwan's northernmost point, Cape Fugui.

History 
While known to earlier explorers, including the Dutch, the area was first explicitly mentioned in Chinese annals in 1694 as Shimenshan. During the period of Imperial Japanese rule, Shimen was called Sekimon Village , and was governed under Tansui District of Taihoku Prefecture. In 1945 when the Kuomintang took over administration of Taiwan the area became Shimen Rural Township, a part of Taipei County. With the reorganization of Taipei County in 2010, Shimen became a district of the newly created New Taipei City.

Geography

The interior of Shimen is predominantly mountainous, with small areas of flat land on the coast. The district is bordered to the north by the East China Sea, to the southwest by Sanzhi District, and to the southeast by  Jinshan District.

Administration
Shimen is part of New Taipei City, a special municipality under the Republic of China government. The district itself is divided into nine villages: Shanxi, Shimen, Laomei, Jianlu, Maolin, Caoli, Qianhua/Cianhua, Fuji, and Demao.

Economy
Tourism is a major contributor to the economy of Shimen, which also produces a number of agricultural goods including mandarins, peanuts, and tea.

Education
Shimen has one junior high school, Shimen Junior High, and three elementary schools; Shimen, Laomei and Qianhua.

Tourist attractions

Historical buildings
The Fuguijiao Lighthouse is located at Cape Fugui.

Nature
Shimen is home to Baisha Bay.

Festivals
Shimen has also been home to an annual kite festival since the year 2000, drawing competitors from around the world.

Others
 Fuji Fishing Port
 Temple of the Eighteen Lords

Infrastructure
Shimen is the site location for Taiwan's first nuclear power plant, the Jinshan Nuclear Power Plant.

Transportation
The main road route through the district is the Provincial Highway 2. It is also served by a number of other county-level roads. There is no rail transportation in the district.

See also
 New Taipei City
 List of Taiwanese superlatives

References

Districts of New Taipei